Casius can refer to:

Casius (see), a former see of the Catholic Church
Casius quadrangle, a map of Mars
Mount Casius (disambiguation), several mountains

See also
Cassius (disambiguation)